Ajaib Kamal (1933-2011) was a writer of the Punjabi language. Born in the Hoshiarpur District of the Punjab, he later moved to Kenya. As a poet and playwright, his work is considered part of the modernist tradition in Punjabi literature. Beginning as a writer of ghazals, he later shifted to other verse forms and is considered a specialist of the long verse form in Punjabi. He has also written several dramas in Punjabi including Chaanak Anne Han, Hatheli Te Ugya Shehr, Dahri Wala Ghora, and Langra Aasmaan.

References
 

1933 births
2011 deaths
Kenyan Sikhs
Kenyan poets
Indian male poets
Kenyan people of Indian descent
People from Hoshiarpur
Indian emigrants to Kenya
Kenyan people of Punjabi descent
Poets from Punjab, India
Punjabi-language poets